The center of the Universe is a concept that lacks a coherent definition in modern astronomy; according to standard cosmological theories on the shape of the universe, it has no center.

Historically, different people have suggested various locations as the center of the Universe. Many mythological cosmologies included an axis mundi, the central axis of a flat Earth that connects the Earth, heavens, and other realms together. In the 4th century BC Greece, philosophers developed the geocentric model, based on astronomical observation; this model proposed that the center of the Universe lies at the center of a spherical, stationary Earth, around which the Sun, Moon, planets, and stars rotate. With the development of the heliocentric model by Nicolaus Copernicus in the 16th century, the Sun was believed to be the center of the Universe, with the planets (including Earth) and stars orbiting it.

In the early-20th century, the discovery of other galaxies and the development of the Big Bang theory led to the development of cosmological models of a homogeneous, isotropic Universe, which lacks a central point and is expanding at all points.

Outside astronomy

In religion or mythology, the axis mundi (also cosmic axis, world axis, world pillar, columna cerului, center of the world) is a point described as the center of the world, the connection between it and Heaven, or both.

Mount Hermon was regarded as the axis mundi in Canaanite tradition, from where the sons of God are introduced descending in 1 Enoch (1En6:6). The ancient Greeks regarded several sites as places of earth's omphalos (navel) stone, notably the oracle at Delphi, while still maintaining a belief in a cosmic world tree and in Mount Olympus as the abode of the gods. Judaism has the Temple Mount and Mount Sinai, Christianity has the Mount of Olives and Calvary, Islam has Mecca, said to be the place on earth that was created first, and the Temple Mount (Dome of the Rock). In Shinto, the Ise Shrine is the omphalos.  In addition to the Kun Lun Mountains, where it is believed the peach tree of immortality is located, the Chinese folk religion recognizes four other specific mountains as pillars of the world.

Sacred places constitute world centers (omphalos) with the altar or place of prayer as the axis. Altars, incense sticks, candles and torches form the axis by sending a column of smoke, and prayer, toward heaven. The architecture of sacred places often reflects this role. "Every temple or palace--and by extension, every sacred city or royal residence--is a Sacred Mountain, thus becoming a Centre." The stupa of Hinduism, and later Buddhism, reflects Mount Meru. Cathedrals are laid out in the form of a cross, with the vertical bar representing the union of Earth and heaven as the horizontal bars represent union of people to one another, with the altar at the intersection. Pagoda structures in Asian temples take the form of a stairway linking Earth and heaven. A steeple in a church or a minaret in a mosque also serve as connections of Earth and heaven. Structures such as the maypole, derived from the Saxons' Irminsul, and the totem pole among indigenous peoples of the Americas also represent world axes. The calumet, or sacred pipe, represents a column of smoke (the soul) rising form a world center. A mandala creates a world center within the boundaries of its two-dimensional space analogous to that created in three-dimensional space by a shrine.

In medieval times some Christians thought of Jerusalem as the center of the world (Latin: umbilicus mundi, Greek: Omphalos), and was so represented in the so-called T and O maps. Byzantine hymns speak of the Cross being "planted in the center of the earth."

Center of a flat Earth

The Flat Earth model is a belief that the Earth's shape is a plane or disk covered by a firmament containing heavenly bodies. Most pre-scientific cultures have had conceptions of a Flat Earth, including Greece until the classical period, the Bronze Age and Iron Age civilizations of the Near East until the Hellenistic period, India until the Gupta period (early centuries AD) and China until the 17th century. It was also typically held in the aboriginal cultures of the Americas, and a flat Earth domed by the firmament in the shape of an inverted bowl is common in pre-scientific societies.

"Center" is well-defined in a Flat Earth model.  A flat Earth would have a definite geographic center.  There would also be a unique point at the exact center of a spherical firmament (or a firmament that was a half-sphere).

Earth as the center of the Universe

The Flat Earth model gave way to an understanding of a Spherical Earth. Aristotle (384–322 BC)  provided observational arguments supporting the idea of a spherical Earth, namely that different stars are visible in different locations, travelers going south see southern constellations rise higher above the horizon, and the shadow of Earth on the Moon during a lunar eclipse is round, and spheres cast circular shadows while discs generally do not.

This understanding was accompanied by models of the Universe that depicted the Sun, Moon, stars, and naked eye planets circling the spherical Earth, including the noteworthy models of Aristotle (see Aristotelian physics) and Ptolemy. This geocentric model was the dominant model from the 4th century BC until the 17th century AD.

Sun as center of the Universe

Heliocentrism, or heliocentricism, is the astronomical model in which the Earth and planets revolve around a relatively stationary Sun at the center of the Solar System. The word comes from the Greek ( helios "sun" and  kentron "center").

The notion that the Earth revolves around the Sun had been proposed as early as the 3rd century BC by  Aristarchus of Samos, but had received no support from most other ancient astronomers.

Nicolaus Copernicus' major theory of a heliocentric model was published in De revolutionibus orbium coelestium (On the Revolutions of the Celestial Spheres), in 1543, the year of his death, though he had formulated the theory several decades earlier. Copernicus' ideas were not immediately accepted, but they did begin a paradigm shift away from the Ptolemaic geocentric model to a heliocentric model. The Copernican revolution, as this paradigm shift would come to be called, would last until Isaac Newton’s work over a century later.

Johannes Kepler published his first two laws about planetary motion in 1609, having found them by analyzing the astronomical observations of Tycho Brahe. Kepler's third law was published in 1619. The first law was "The orbit of every planet is an ellipse with the Sun at one of the two foci."

On 7 January 1610 Galileo used his telescope, with optics superior to what had been available   before. He described "three fixed stars, totally invisible by their smallness", all close to Jupiter, and lying on a straight line through it. Observations on subsequent nights showed that the positions of these "stars" relative to Jupiter were changing in a way that would have been inexplicable if they had really been fixed stars. On 10 January Galileo noted that one of them had disappeared, an observation which he attributed to its being hidden behind Jupiter. Within a few days he concluded that they were orbiting Jupiter: Galileo stated that he had reached this conclusion on 11 January. He had discovered three of Jupiter's four largest satellites (moons). He discovered the fourth on 13 January.

His observations of the satellites of Jupiter created a revolution in astronomy: a planet with smaller planets orbiting it did not conform to the principles of Aristotelian Cosmology, which held that all heavenly bodies should circle the Earth. Many astronomers and philosophers initially refused to believe that Galileo could have discovered such a thing;  by showing that, like Earth, other planets could also have moons of their own that followed prescribed paths, and hence that orbital mechanics didn't apply only to the Earth, planets, and Sun, what Galileo had essentially done was to show that other planets might be "like Earth".

Newton made clear his heliocentric view of the Solar System – developed in a somewhat modern way, because already in the mid-1680s he recognised the "deviation of the Sun" from the centre of gravity of the solar system. For Newton, it was not precisely the centre of the Sun or any other body that could be considered at rest, but rather "the common centre of gravity of the Earth, the Sun and all the Planets is to be esteem'd the Centre of the World", and this centre of gravity "either is at rest or moves uniformly forward in a right line" (Newton adopted the "at rest" alternative in view of common consent that the centre, wherever it was, was at rest).

Milky Way's Galactic Center as center of the Universe

Before the 1920s, it was generally believed that there were no galaxies other than the Milky Way (see for example The Great Debate). Thus, to astronomers of previous centuries, there was no distinction between a hypothetical center of the galaxy and a hypothetical center of the universe.

In 1750 Thomas Wright, in his work An original theory or new hypothesis of the Universe, correctly speculated that the Milky Way might be a body of a huge number of stars held together by gravitational forces rotating about a Galactic Center, akin to the Solar System but on a much larger scale. The resulting disk of stars can be seen as a band on the sky from the Earth's perspective inside the disk. In a treatise in 1755, Immanuel Kant elaborated on Wright's idea about the structure of the Milky Way. In 1785, William Herschel proposed such a model based on observation and measurement, leading to scientific acceptance of galactocentrism, a form of heliocentrism with the Sun at the center of the Milky Way.

The 19th century astronomer Johann Heinrich von Mädler proposed the Central Sun Hypothesis, according to which the stars of the universe revolved around a point in the Pleiades.

The nonexistence of a center of the Universe
In 1917, Heber Doust Curtis observed a nova within what then was called the "Andromeda Nebula". Searching the photographic record, 11 more novae were discovered. Curtis noticed that novas in Andromeda were drastically fainter than novas in the Milky Way. Based on this, Curtis was able to estimate that Andromeda was 500,000 light-years away. As a result, Curtis became a proponent of the so-called "island Universes" hypothesis, which held that objects previously believed to be spiral nebulae within the Milky Way were actually independent galaxies.

In 1920, the Great Debate between Harlow Shapley and Curtis took place, concerning the nature of the Milky Way, spiral nebulae, and the dimensions of the Universe. To support his claim that the Great Andromeda Nebula (M31) was an external galaxy, Curtis also noted the appearance of dark lanes resembling the dust clouds in this galaxy, as well as the significant Doppler shift. In 1922 Ernst Öpik presented an elegant and simple astrophysical method to estimate the distance of M31. His result put the Andromeda Nebula far outside this galaxy at a distance of about 450,000 parsec, which is about 1,500,000 ly. Edwin Hubble settled the debate about whether other galaxies exist in 1925 when he identified extragalactic Cepheid variable stars for the first time on astronomical photos of M31. These were made using the 2.5 metre (100 in) Hooker telescope, and they enabled the distance of Great Andromeda Nebula to be determined. His measurement demonstrated conclusively that this feature was not a cluster of stars and gas within this galaxy, but an entirely separate galaxy located a significant distance from the Milky Way. This proved the existence of other galaxies.

Expanding Universe
Hubble also demonstrated that the redshift of other galaxies is approximately proportional to their distance from Earth (Hubble's law). This raised the appearance of this galaxy being in the center of an expanding Universe, however, Hubble rejected the findings philosophically:

The redshift observations of Hubble, in which galaxies appear to be moving away from us at a rate proportional to their distance from us, are now understood to be a result of the metric expansion of space. This is the increase of the distance between two distant parts of the Universe with time, and is an intrinsic expansion whereby the scale of space itself changes. As Hubble theorized, all observers anywhere in the Universe will observe a similar effect.

Copernican and cosmological principles
The Copernican principle, named after Nicolaus Copernicus, states that the Earth is not in a central, specially favored position. Hermann Bondi named the principle after Copernicus in the mid-20th century, although the principle itself dates back to the 16th-17th century paradigm shift away from the geocentric Ptolemaic system.

The cosmological principle is an extension of the Copernican principle which states that the Universe is homogeneous (the same observational evidence is available to observers at different locations in the Universe) and isotropic (the same observational evidence is available by looking in any direction in the Universe). A homogeneous, isotropic Universe does not have a center.

See also

 Center of the universe (disambiguation)
 Cosmic microwave background
 Earth's inner core
 Galactic Center
 Geographical centre of Earth
 Great Attractor
 Illustris project
 List of places referred to as the Center of the Universe
 Multiverse
 Religious cosmology
 Sun – the center of the Solar System
 Three-torus model of the universe

Notes

References 

Center of the Universe
Physical cosmology
Obsolete scientific theories